The Meadow Building (known as "Meadows" to students, aka Meadow Buildings) is part of Christ Church, Oxford, England, one of the Oxford colleges, looking out south onto Christ Church Meadow on Broad Walk and then along the straight tree-lined Poplar Walk to the River Thames.

The building is used as the public entrance for paying visitors to Christ Church instead of the main entrance under Tom Tower in St Aldate's.

History and description

The building was constructed in 1862–66 to the designs of Sir Thomas Deane of Dublin in the Venetian style (favoured by the Christ Church art historian John Ruskin). Single rooms in the Meadow Building look out over either the college or the Christ Church Meadow, although originally, college undergraduates would be given a suite of rooms with views overlooking both sides. Recent building work has converted most of these rooms to ensuite while leaving one staircase, which is primarily non-residential, as was.

When it was first built, the relative distance of the Meadow Building from the more fashionable Peckwater and Canterbury Quads meant that it was considered the least desirable accommodation in college.

Pevsner described it is a "joyless building".

Literary references
The building has featured in a number of books:

Gallery

See also

 Venetian Gothic
 Tom Quad
 Peckwater Quadrangle
 Blue Boar Quadrangle
 Christ Church Library

References

1866 establishments in England
Residential buildings completed in 1866
Christ Church, Oxford
Christ Church Meadow, Oxford

Buildings and structures of the University of Oxford